"A Reason to Fight" is a song by American heavy metal band Disturbed. It was released as the second single off of their seventh studio album Evolution. It topped the Billboard Mainstream Rock Songs chart for three weeks and became the band's record-breaking sixth consecutive number one on the chart.

Background
In July 2018, upon the completion of recording the band's seventh studio album Evolution, frontman David Draiman polled fans as to whether they preferred the first single to be a heavy rock song, more akin to most of their back catalogue, or a more mellow ballad song, more comparable to their cover of Simon & Garfunkel's "The Sound of Silence". Out of 80,000 respondents, over 83% chose "heavy" over "ballad". As a result, "Are You Ready" was released as the first single from the album on August 16, 2018.

The album's second single, the ballad "A Reason to Fight", was later released on September 21, 2018. The song was chosen as a single to help represent the band's change in sound for the Evolution album, comparing it to what Metallica's "Black Album" was to the rest of their career up until that point. A music video was also released at the time of the single's release, and was directed by Matt Mahurin, who had previously directed their "The Sound of Silence" music video.

Themes and composition
Lyrically, the song is about battling addiction and depression; the song is meant to provide a positive and hopeful message for those struggling with it. The rough song idea was initially proposed by guitarist Dan Donegan, and supported by frontman and lyricist David Draiman, who felt a personal connection to its message, having seen a number of people close to him struggle with addiction and depression. The song is most commonly referred to as a ballad prominently featuring acoustic guitar. The song's musical direction was inspired by the band's success with their cover of "The Sound of Silence".

Reception
Vince Neilstein of MetalSucks was critical of the song, summing it up as "Draiman whining over top acoustic guitars", but conceded that it was poised to do well at rock radio.

Personnel
Disturbed
David Draiman – lead vocals
Dan Donegan – guitars, programming
John Moyer – bass
Mike Wengren – drums

Charts

Weekly charts

Year-end charts

References

2018 singles
2018 songs
Disturbed (band) songs
Rock ballads
Reprise Records singles
Warner Records singles
Songs written by Kevin Churko
Song recordings produced by Kevin Churko
2010s ballads